Phalonidia monocera is a species of moth of the family Tortricidae. It is found in Santa Catarina, Brazil.

The wingspan is about 10 mm. The ground colour of the forewings is pale yellowish cream, the basal portion of the wing and dorsum beyond the median fascia is strigulated (finely streaked) with brownish and rust. There are some blackish dots and strigulae along the costa. The hindwings are cream, tinged with brownish terminally and with brownish-grey strigulation.

Etymology
The species name refers to the presence of a thorn of the aedeagus and is derived by the authors from pseudo-Greek mon (meaning single) and ceros (meaning horn). In ancient Greek, μόνος (mónos) is actually used for single and κέρας (kéras) for horn.

References

Moths described in 2007
Phalonidia